My Cherie is the 12th album by Scottish singer Sheena Easton, released in 1995 on MCA Records. The album consists of adult pop songs. The title track was issued as a single but failed to chart. Other tracks include a Diane Warren written song, "You've Learned To Live Without Me," "Please Don't Be Scared" (previously recorded by Barry Manilow), and "Crazy Love" (previously recorded by Amy Keys and subsequently covered by Luther Vandross).

The album marked Easton's reunion with producer Christopher Neil, who worked on her first three albums. To date, this marks the last Easton album to be released stateside.

The songs "Flower in the Rain" and "Dance Away the Blues" were both used in a TV episode of "The Outer Limits" entitled "Falling Star", featuring Easton as a faded rock star.

"Flower in the Rain" was co-written by Easton and released as a single in France.

Track listing
"My Cherie" (Antonina Armato, Wendell Wellman) - 4:20
"Till Death Do Us Part" (Antonina Armato, Jorge Corante, Mugg James) - 4:52
"All I Ask of You" (Chris Eaton, Pam Sheyne) - 5:05
"Flower in the Rain" (Sheena Easton, Arnie Roman, Tina Shafer) - 3:32
"You've Learned to Live without Me" (Diane Warren) - 4:26
"Too Much in Love" (Glen Ballard, Clif Magness) - 4:04
"Please Don't Be Scared" (Mindy Sterling) - 4:21
"Next to You" (George Merrill, Danny O'Keefe) - 3:33
"Dance Away the Blues" (Chris Eaton) - 4:03
"Crazy Love" (David Lasley, Robin Lerner, Marsha Malamet, Allan Rich) - 4:34

Critical Reception
"Easton previews her forthcoming album with a swinging ballad that sways with lush, retro-R&B rhythms. Easton sounds as good as ever. Producer Denny Diante surrounds her with brassy horns and swirling background vocals. In all, a solid contender for Top 40, AC and urban level play."  Billboard Magazine, Week ending February 25, 1995.

Production
 Executive Producer – Denny Diante 
 Producers – Denny Diante (Tracks 1 & 7); Narada Michael Walden (Track 2); Christopher Neil (Tracks 3, 8 & 9); Ric Wake (Track 4); David Foster (Tracks 5 & 10); Glen Ballard (Track 6).
 Mastered by Wally Traugott

Personnel
 Sheena Easton – lead vocals, backing vocals (1, 3, 5, 6, 8, 9)
 Randy Waldman – keyboards (1, 7, 8), programming (1, 7), arrangements (1, 7), Moog Source bass (8)
 Louis Biancaniello – keyboards (2), bass (2), programming (2), drum programming (2), additional arrangements (2)
 Steve Piggot – keyboards (3, 9), programming (3, 9), drums (9)
 Peter Zizzo – keyboards (4), programming (4), guitar (4), arrangements (4)
 David Foster – acoustic piano (5, 10), arrangements (5, 10)
 Claude Gaudette – synthesizer (5), programming (5), Fairlight CMI (10),  Akai synthesizer (10), Roland synthesizer (10), Synclavier bass (10)
 Glen Ballard – keyboards (6), organ (6), programming (6), drum programming (6)
 Bruce Gaitsch – guitar (1)
 Stef Burns – guitar (2)
 Danny Jacob – guitar (3, 9)
 Michael Thompson – guitar (5)
 Michael Landau – guitar (6)
 John Morton – guitar (8)
 Phil Palmer – guitar (9)
 Neil Stubenhaus – bass guitar (5)
 Narada Michael Walden – live tom-tom overdubs (2), arrangements (2)
 Mike Baird – drums (5)
 David Frank – drum programming (8), programming (8)
 David Boruff – saxophone (1)
 Paul Hanson – saxophone (1)
 Chuck Findley – trumpet (1)
 Anne King – trumpet (1)
 Jeremy Lubbock – string arrangements (5, 10)
 Jules Chakin – orchestra contractor (5, 10)
 Assa Drori – concertmaster (5, 10)
 Charles James Flemming – backing vocals (1)
 Nikita Germaine – backing vocals (2)
 Tina Hicks – backing vocals (2)
 Natalie Jackson – backing vocals (2)
 Claytoven Richardson – backing vocals (2)
 Beth Anderson – backing vocals (8)
 George Merrill – backing vocals (8)
 Shannon Rubicam – backing vocals (8)
 Chris Eaton – backing vocals (9)

Additional Credits
 Design – John Coulter 
 Management – Harriett Wasserman 
 Hair– Barron Matalon 
 Logos and Song Title Calligraphy – Margo Chase 
 Make-up – Francesca Tolot 
 Still Photography – Photonica 
 Stylist – Vivian Turner 
 Portrait Photo – Albert Sanchez

References

[ My Cherie] at AllMusic
Billboard.com

1995 albums
Sheena Easton albums
Albums produced by Christopher Neil
Albums produced by David Foster
Albums produced by Glen Ballard
Albums produced by Humberto Gatica
Albums produced by Narada Michael Walden
MCA Records albums